The Riverland Pipeline System is a natural gas transmission pipeline supplying gas to the Riverland region of South Australia. It is owned by Australian Gas Networks (formerly Envestra) and operated by the APA Group. The pipeline was built in 1995 by South Australian Gas Company and transferred to Envestra when it was privatised in 1997. Most of the pipe is buried to a depth of  but it is deeper and has thicker walls in areas of high risk such as under road crossings.

The Riverland Pipeline is supplied by gas from the Angaston lateral on the Moomba Adelaide Pipeline System (MAPS). The main pipeline runs from Angaston to Berri in the Riverland with a lateral supply line branching near Sedan to Murray Bridge. Gas can also be delivered to Mildura vie the Mildura Pipeline connection at Berri.

The Riverland Pipeline was covered by the NGL under the Gas Code until 1999, but has not been subject to that regulation since 1999.

References

Natural gas pipelines in Australia
Energy in South Australia
Pipelines in South Australia